Longiantrum burmaensis is a moth of the family Erebidae first described by Michael Fibiger in 2010. It is known from Myanmar.

The wingspan is 11–12 mm. The head, patagia, anterior part of the tegulae, prothorax, basal part of the costa, costal part of the medial area, subterminal and terminal area, including the fringes are blackish brown. The costal medial area is quadrangular. The forewing ground colour is light yellow grey and unicolorous in the most basal area, other parts of the forewing are suffused by black and brown areas. The crosslines are untraceable, except for the indistinct subterminal and subterminal lines. The terminal line is well marked by black interneural dots. The hindwing is light grey and the fringes beige. The underside of the forewing is light brown, while the underside of the hindwing is light grey.

References

Micronoctuini
Moths described in 2010
Taxa named by Michael Fibiger